is a series of action-adventure games created by Hideki Kamiya, developed by PlatinumGames, and owned by Sega. The franchise was introduced in 2009 with Bayonetta. Two sequels were released, Bayonetta 2 (2014) and Bayonetta 3 (2022), as well as a spinoff, Bayonetta Origins: Cereza and the Lost Demon (2023). In the games, players control a witch nicknamed Bayonetta as she wields dual pistols, shooters in her high heels, and long, magically transforming hair which becomes a deadly weapon.

Games

Bayonetta (2009)

The first game in the series was directed by Hideki Kamiya, who created the Devil May Cry franchise when he was working at Capcom. It was the third title in Platinum's four-game contract with Sega. The game was released on October 29, 2009, in Japan, and was released worldwide in January 2010 for Xbox 360 and PlayStation 3. The game received generally positive reviews upon release. More than 1.35 million units of the game were shipped. Although it was Platinum's most commercially successful game at that time, the company was disappointed with its sales. A remastered version for the game was released alongside Vanquish for PlayStation 4 and Xbox One in February 2020.

Bayonetta 2 (2014)

Bayonetta 2 was announced in 2012 during a Nintendo Direct for the Wii U. The decision received backlash from fans, since the game would not be available on PlayStation 3 and Xbox 360. Platinum was initially working with Sega to create the sequel, but Sega decided to cancel the game during the game's development. Nintendo subsequently revived the project. According to producer Atsushi Inaba, the game would not have been possible if they did not get the funding and the support from Nintendo. Sega remained as the game's consultant. The game was directed by Yusuke Hashimoto, and Kamiya has a supervision role. The game was released in 2014 to very positive reviews. While sales have not been fully disclosed, by March 2018, Nintendo confirmed the Switch version had sold 400,000 copies during its first nine weeks, compared to the 300,000 copies the Wii U version sold during the same period.

Bayonetta 3 (2022)

A third game in the series was announced by Nintendo at The Game Awards 2017. A gameplay trailer was shown at the September Nintendo Direct 2021. It was released for the Nintendo Switch on October 28, 2022. The game also features a playable teaser for Cereza and the Lost Demon as a secret level.

Bayonetta Origins: Cereza and the Lost Demon (2023) 

A prequel companion game to Bayonetta 3, focusing on Cereza as a young girl, was announced by Nintendo at The Game Awards 2022. It was released on Nintendo Switch on March 17, 2023.

Other media
An anime film based on the first game, titled Bayonetta: Bloody Fate, was produced by Gonzo and released in 2013.

Bayonetta appears as a downloadable character in Sega's multiplayer fighting game Anarchy Reigns, and as a special guest character alongside Jeanne and Rodin in Nintendo's action game The Wonderful 101. She also appears as a downloadable character in Super Smash Bros. for Nintendo 3DS and Wii U, and as an unlockable character in the sequel Super Smash Bros. Ultimate. Both games also feature a stage based on the falling Umbra Clock Tower which appeared in both Bayonetta games. Rodin was also added as an Assist Trophy in Ultimate.

The original Bayonetta was also used as a basis for a Pachislot and an 16-bit-style browser game.

Reception

Bayonetta, Bayonetta 2 and Bayonetta 3 all received generally positive reviews from critics, according to review aggregator Metacritic. Bayonetta 2 was nominated for Game of the Year at The Game Awards 2014, though it ultimately lost to Dragon Age: Inquisition.

References

 
Action-adventure video games by series
Hack and slash video games by series
PlatinumGames games
Sega Games franchises
Video game franchises
Video game franchises introduced in 2009
Video games about demons
Video games about witchcraft
Video games developed in Japan